Gisda Cyf v Barratt [2010] UKSC 41 is a UK labour law case, concerning unfair dismissal governed by the Employment Rights Act 1996.

Facts
Gisda Cyf employed Ms Barratt. On 30 November 2006 a letter was sent to her that she was being summarily dismissed for gross misconduct, apparently misconduct at a private party, ‘witnessed by one of the company’s service users’. She had been given a disciplinary hearing, and then told she would hear by post. Ms Barratt was visiting her sister who was giving birth, and did not open the letter until 4 December. She appealed through the charity’s internal procedure, and that was dismissed. Then she filed an unfair dismissal claim for sex discrimination on 2 March 2007.

Bean J in the Employment Appeal Tribunal held it was within time, because the principle in The Brimnes could not be adapted to the employment law context. Mummery LJ in the Court of Appeal agreed.

Judgment
Lord Kerr for the Supreme Court (Lord Hope, Lord Saville, Lord Walker and Lady Hale) held that because the Employment Rights Act 1996 section 97 is part of an employees’ charter of rights, about which people must be properly informed, that the employer’s communication of dismissal was ineffective until Miss Barratt was actually told. Starting by reference to the judgments of the courts below, Lord Kerr said the following.

See also

2010 Judgments of the Supreme Court of the United Kingdom
UK labour law

Notes

References

External links
Gisda's homepage

United Kingdom labour case law
Supreme Court of the United Kingdom cases
2010 in case law
2010 in British law
United Kingdom employment contract case law